Lucyna Nyka is a Polish architect, full professor at Gdańsk University of Technology. Dean of the Faculty of Architecture (since 2016), head of Department of Marine and Industrial Architecture, in 2008-2016 a vice-dean for Research

Her research interests focus on issues concerning water-related architecture and urban landscapes. She is the author and co-author of many projects focused on urban renewal. She was an author of the EU-founded (Audiovisual and Cultural Agency) Intensive Program ‘Bridging the City – Water in Architecture, Urban Spaces and Planning’, co-author of ‘Sensing the City – Designing Urban Experience’ and ‘Art & Science– Synergy of Technology and Art in the City Spaces’.  She is an author of the ‘Reclaiming the Royal Brook in Gdańsk’ project co-financed by Pomeranian Foundation for Environmental Protection and Water Management, participated in the project ‘Think BETA - Evolution of Smart Cities’ co-financed by German Federal Ministry for Education and Research. Since 2011 she has been a Faculty coordinator of the international CEEPUS ‘Urban Innovation Network’ programme and a visiting expert to European Workshop on Waterfront Urban Design (Lusófona University Lisbon). She is an invited guest lecturer and studio critic at many European universities.

Teaching subjects 
 Architecture

Research interests 
 Architecture
 Urban planning
 Public utility objects architecture

Publications 
Lucyna Nyka is an author of two books (‘Od architektury cyrkulacji do urbanistycznych krajobrazów’, 2006 (From Architecture of Circulations to Urban Landscapes) and ‘Architektura i woda – przekraczanie granic', 2013 (Architecture and Water – Crossing the Boundaries). She is an editor of several books, e.g. L. Nyka (Ed.): ‘Water for urban strategies’. Weimar: Verlag der Bauhaus-Universität Weimar 2007, L. Nyka, J. Szczepański (Eds.): ‘Culture for Revitalisation/ Revitalisation for Culture’. Laznia CCA, Gdansk, 2010, and author and co-author of many scientific papers published internationally, e.g. Nyka L.: From Structures to Landscapes – towards re-conceptualisation of urban condition, in: Architectural Research Addressing  Societal Challenges, Taylor & Francis 2016 (in print). Nyka L.: Experiencing Historic Waterways and Water Landscapes of the Vistula River Delta, in: F. Vallerani, F. Visentin (Eds.) Waterways as Cultural Landscapes, Routledge 2017 (in print), Nyka L.: Polder And City: Sustaining Water Landscapes on an Urban Edge, in: SGEM 2016, Wien, Urbanowicz K., Nyka L.: Interactive and media architecture – from social encounters to city planning strategies. Procedia Engineering  (2016), Nyka L., Borucka J., Urbanowicz K.: Experiencing the Ocean – the Paths for Urban Development of São Pedro do Estoril, in: P. Ressano Garcia (Ed.), Waterfront Cascais, University Lusofona, Lisboa 2015, and many others.

Membership of societies 
 Research Committee by the European Association for Architectural Education (EAAE) (2011-2012)
 EAAE Council member (2012-2014)
 Member of the Architecture and Urbanism Committee by the Polish Academy of Sciences (PAN) (since 2011)

Redactor 
Editorial board member and a reviewer to several journals in Poland and abroad, e.g.:
 Architecture and Urbanism Quarterly (Kwartalnik Architektury i Urbanistyki) issued by Polish Academy of Sciences, Architectus, etc.

Books 
 Lucyna Nyka Od architektury cyrkulacji do urbanistycznych krajobrazów (From Architecture of Circulations to Urban Landscapes) Gdańsk 2006, 
 Lucyna Nyka Architektura i woda – przekraczanie granic, 2013, (Architecture and Water – Crossing the Boundaries) 
 Lucyna Nyka (red.): Water for urban strategies. Weimar: Verlag der Bauhaus-Universität Weimar 2007
 Lucyna Nyka, Jakub Szczepański (red.): Culture for Revitalisation/Revitalisation for Culture. Łaźnia CCA, Gdańsk, 2010

References

External links 
 Lucyna Nyka
 Lucyna Nyka in Scholar Google.com
 Lucyna Nyka in Research Gate

Gdańsk University of Technology alumni
Academic staff of the Gdańsk University of Technology
Living people
21st-century Polish architects
Year of birth missing (living people)